The Lutterworth Press, one of the oldest independent British publishing houses, has  traded since the late eighteenth century - initially as the Religious Tract Society (RTS). The Lutterworth imprint, named after the small English town of Lutterworth in Leicestershire, where John Wyclif served as Rector in the fourteenth century, has been used since 1932, and Lutterworth continued most of the then current RTS publications. The main areas have been religion, children's books and general adult non-fiction.

The religious list, as with the RTS, tended to publish fairly evangelical writers, such as Norman Grubb, but gradually broadened in the second half of the twentieth century.

Well-known general writers first published by Lutterworth include David Attenborough and Patrick Moore. The list specialises in popular history and art history, but also publishes books on a wide range of other subjects.

The children's list, which built on the strength of the Boy's Own Paper and Girl's Own Paper, has included well-known authors such as Enid Blyton, W.E. Johns, and Laura Ingalls Wilder. The book From the Dairyman's Daughter to Worrals of the WAAF: The R.T.S., Lutterworth Press and Children's Literature, edited by Dennis Butts and Pat Garrett, 2006, chronicles the history of the publishing house.

The Press was originally based exclusively in London before expanding its operations to Guildford in Surrey where it operated from until 1983. It has been based in Cambridge, England since 1984.

References

External links
Official company website

Christian mass media companies
Book publishing companies of the United Kingdom
Christian publishing companies